Joe Stansberry (born March 17, 1956) is an American professional golfer.

Early life 
Stansberry was born in Minneapolis, Minnesota. He attended the University of New Mexico.

Golf career 
He turned professional in 1980 before regaining his amateur status in 1993. He then had a successful amateur career which included winning the 2003 Minnesota State Open and a semi-final appearance in the 1997 U.S. Amateur Public Links Championship. He turned professional again when he turned 50 in 2006 and tried to qualify for the Champions Tour. He failed to win a place on the tour, but has played in a few tournaments, recording a best finish of tied for 26th at the 2008 3M Championship.

Despite not making onto the Champions Tour, Stansberry has had some success as a senior, including victories at the 2008 Colorado Senior Open and the 2009 Texas Senior Open.

Amateur wins
1993 MGA Mid-Amateur
1995 MGA Mid-Amateur, MGA Players' Championship
1996 Minnesota State Amateur
1997 MGA Amateur championship
2005 Minnesota State Amateur

Professional wins
2003 Minnesota State Open (as an amateur)
2008 Colorado Senior Open
2009 Maker's Mark Texas Senior Open

References

External links

Profile on Yahoo sports

American male golfers
New Mexico Lobos men's golfers
Golfers from Minneapolis
People from Minnetonka, Minnesota
1956 births
Living people